The following is a list of football stadiums in Uzbekistan, ordered by capacity. The minimum capacity is 5,000.

Current stadiums

See also
 Football in Uzbekistan
 List of Asian stadiums by capacity
 List of association football stadiums by capacity

External links
 Uzbekistan Football Association Website

References

Uzbekistan
Football stadiums